Manderscheid can refer to:

Manderscheid, Bernkastel-Wittlich, a town in Germany
Manderscheid (Verbandsgemeinde), a former collective municipality in Bernkastel-Wittlich, Rhineland-Palatinate, Germany
Manderscheid, Bitburg-Prüm a village in Germany
County of Manderscheid, historical state of the Holy Roman Empire centered on Manderscheid, Bernkastel-Wittlich